Drayton Valley Industrial Airport  is located  northeast of Drayton Valley, Alberta, Canada.

References

External links
Drayton Valley Industrial Airport on COPA's Places to Fly airport directory

Registered aerodromes in Alberta
Brazeau County